Neocollyris maindroni is a species of ground beetle in the genus Neocollyris in the family Carabidae. It was described by Horn in 1905.

References

Maindroni, Neocollyris
Beetles described in 1905